Chris Cain (born November 19, 1955) is an American blues musician.

He began playing professionally as a teenager in local clubs, at festivals, and at private events. He attended Pomona College.

Cain received four Blues Music Award nominations in 1987 for his debut album, Late Night City Blues, including Guitarist of the Year. He signed to Blind Pig Records in 1990 and released his second album, Cuttin' Loose, then released Can't Buy A Break in 1992 and Somewhere Along the Way in 1995. 2018 brought more nominations, including Blues Music Awards Guitarist of the Year, Blues Blast Awards Best Males Blues Artist and Best Contemporary Blues Album for the 2017 release, Chris Cain.

Discography
1987 - Late Night City Blues (Blue Rock-It Records)
1990 - Cuttin' Loose (Blind Pig Records)
1992 - Can't Buy a Break (Blind Pig)
1995 - Somewhere Along the Way (Blind Pig)
1997 - Unscheduled Flight (Blue Rock-It)
1998 - Live at the Rep (Chris Cain Records)
1999 - Christmas Cain: Blues for the Holidays (Chris Cain Records)
2001 - Cain Does King (Blue Rock-It)
2003 - Hall of Shame (Blue Rock-It)
2010 - So Many Miles (Blue Rock-It)
2016 - King of the Blues with Rodger Fox Big Band (T-Bones Records)
2017 - Chris Cain (Little Village Foundation)
2021 - Raisin' Cain (Alligator Records)

See also
List of bass guitarists
List of Electric blues musicians
List of Jazz blues musicians

References

External links
 Chris Cain official website

1955 births
Living people
American blues guitarists
American male guitarists
Pomona College alumni
American people of Greek descent
African-American guitarists
20th-century American guitarists
20th-century American male musicians
20th-century African-American musicians
21st-century African-American people